Saira Shah (born 5 October 1964) is a British author, reporter and documentary filmmaker. She produces, writes and narrates current affairs films.

Life 

Shah was born in London and raised in Kent, England. She was educated at Bryanston School and read Arabic and Persian at the School of Oriental and African Studies, University of London, graduating in 1986. Her father was Idries Shah, an Indian-Afghan and half-Scottish writer of books on Sufism. Part of his family was originally from Paghman, Afghanistan. Her mother is half-Indian Parsi and half-English. The author Tahir Shah is her brother and she also has a sister, Tahir's twin, Safia Shah.

Shah currently lives between London and rural France with her partner, journalist and photographer Scott Goodfellow, and their son and daughter Hamish and Rosie Goodfellow. Ailsa Goodfellow, their first daughter, died, suddenly, of a pulmonary embolism early in 2017. Shah said: "Ailsa inspired me to write a novel, The Mouse-Proof Kitchen, based on her life, which was published in 2013. By then Ailsa had become our teacher, demonstrating how to live with courage, patience and joy – and proving that the essence of humanity lies far deeper than mere development." The novel gives a vivid account of how the fictional characters Anna and her husband Tobias deal with their daughter Freya's birth and the experiences which they must undergo before fully appreciating the miracle of her life.

News reporter and documentary maker 

Shah's first trip to Afghanistan was when she was 21 years old. She worked for 3 years in Peshawar as a reporter covering the Soviet invasion of Afghanistan. She has also worked as a journalist for Channel 4 News, which she left in 2001. She married and divorced (after 5 years) a Swiss reporter, whom she met in Peshawar.

Shah worked with James Miller on several projects including the films Beneath the Veil (2001), Unholy War (2001), both Channel 4 Dispatches films for the UK documentary company Hardcash productions, and Death in Gaza (2004), for their own TV company Frostbite Films. Miller was killed in 2003. In 2004, Shah won a Current Affairs BAFTA Award for Death in Gaza and in 2005 the film won three Emmy Awards for Outstanding Cinematography For Nonfiction Programming (Single Or Multi-Camera), Outstanding Directing For Nonfiction Programming and Exceptional Merit in Nonfiction Filmmaking (Shah sharing one award as a producer and being a nominee for another as a writer). Shah also appeared on the television programme Breakfast with Frost on 10 August 2003.

Films
 Beneath the Veil
 Death in Gaza
 Unholy War

Film companies
 Frostbite Productions

Books

Newspaper and magazine articles

Interviews

Reviews

Awards 
 2002 Royal Television Society – Best International Current Affairs – Beneath the Veil
 2002 Royal Television Society – Programme of the Year – Beneath the Veil
 2002 Royal Television Society – Reporter of the Year – Saira Shah
 2002 BAFTA – Best current affairs – Beneath the Veil
 2002 One World Media Award – Beneath the Veil
 2002 SAIS-Novartis International Journalism Award – Beneath the Veil
 2002 Mo Amin Courage Under Fire Award – Saira Shah
 2002 International Documentary Association Courage Under Fire Award – Saira Shah
 2002 Peabody Awards – Beneath the Veil and Unholy War
 2002 News and Documentary Emmy awards – Winner of Outstanding Investigative journalism – Beneath the Veil
 2002 News and Documentary Emmy awards – Nomination for Best documentary – Beneath the Veil
 2002 News and Documentary Emmy awards – Outstanding coverage of a continuing news story – Unholy War
 2002 Golden Nymph award, Monte Carlo – Beneath the Veil
 2005 BAFTA – Best current affairs film – Death in Gaza
 2005 Emmy – Exceptional Merit in Nonfiction Filmmaking – Death in Gaza
 2005 Emmy – Nomination for Outstanding Writing for Nonfiction Programming – Death in Gaza
 2005 One World 2005 – Human Rights award – Death in Gaza

See also
 Belinda Carson
 Cassian Harrison
 James Miller (filmmaker)

References

External links 
 
 Interview with CNN
 List of publications by Saira Shah and her family members (works by Idries Shah not included)
 Saira Shah's page, Conville and Walsh literary agency

                   

1964 births
Living people
People educated at Bryanston School
Alumni of SOAS University of London
Journalists from London
Film producers from London
Saira Shah
BAFTA winners (people)
Emmy Award winners
English people of Afghan descent
English people of Indian descent
English people of Scottish descent
People from Kent
English people of Parsi descent
People associated with The Institute for Cultural Research